Alan Riou (born 2 April 1997) is a French cyclist, who currently rides for UCI ProTeam .

Major results
2014
 5th Overall Ronde des Vallées
2015
 3rd Kuurne–Brussels–Kuurne Juniors
 4th Overall Ronde des Vallées
 7th Overall Aubel–Thimister–La Gleize
2017
 3rd Grand Prix d'Isbergues
 6th Grand Prix de la Ville de Nogent-sur-Oise
 7th Paris–Chauny
2018
 1st Stage 2 Tour de l'Avenir
2021
 1st Classic Loire Atlantique
 2nd Paris-Troyes

References

External links

1997 births
Living people
French male cyclists
People from Lannion
Sportspeople from Côtes-d'Armor
Cyclists from Brittany